Parornix anguliferella is a moth of the family Gracillariidae. It is found from Germany to Sardinia, Sicily and Greece and from the Netherlands to southern Russia.

The larvae feed on Amelanchier ovalis, Cydonia oblonga, Prunus avium, Prunus glandulosa, Prunus mahaleb, Prunus persica, Prunus spinosa, Pyrus amygdaliformis, Pyrus communis and Sorbus species. They mine the leaves of their host plant. The mine consists of a lower-surface, epidermal corridor, continued into a blotch. Some silk is deposited in the blotch, causing it to form a weakly contracted tentiform mine. After some time the larva leaves the mine and continues feeding in a folded leaf margin.

References

Parornix
Moths of Europe
Moths described in 1847